Doap Traffiking: The Rise and Fall of Darth Nixon (most commonly abbreviated as Doap Traffiking) is the third studio album by underground rapper and Army of the Pharaohs member Doap Nixon. It was released a few months after Doaps second album; Gray Poupon.

Background

Shortly after the release of Gray Poupon, Doap announced that he is working on his third studio album titled: Doap Traffiking: The Rise And Fall Of Darth Nixon. The album was officially released on 17 November 2011. Fellow pharaohs; Apathy, Blacastan, Celph Titled, Demoz, Esoteric, King Magnetic, Reef The Lost Cauze, OuterSpace, V-Zilla, Vinnie Paz and other artists including Helen Sciandra, Cynthia Holliday and Ill Bill were all featured on the album. Producers include; C-Lance, Illbred, Many Beats, Rythmatik, Level 13 and  DC The Mid Alien.

Track listing

References

2011 albums
Doap Nixon albums
Babygrande Records albums